The Sports Association saint-eugénoise, commonly abbreviated as AS Saint-Eugène or ASSE, is a former Algerian football club based in Algiers, in the municipality of Bologhine, known at the time as Saint-Eugène.

Formed on 1 January 1908, AS Saint Eugène became known, from 1930, as one of the notorious teams of the Algiers. The club won seven titles including the Algiers champion of Division Honor and a Championship and North African Cup.

During the independence of Algeria in 1962, ASSE was dissolved like most other clubs that were founded by European settlers.

History

Honours

Domestic competitions
 League Algiers Football Association
Champion (7): 1930, 1933, 1936, 1943, 1944, 1952, 1957

 Forconi Cup
Winner (1): 1955

International competitions
North African Championship
Winner (1): 1930

North African Cup
Winner (1): 1950

References

External links
 alger-roi.fr
 hubertzakine.blogspot.com

Defunct football clubs in Algeria
Association football clubs established in 1908
Association football clubs disestablished in 1962
1962 disestablishments in Algeria
1908 establishments in Algeria